Vostok Bay is a small bay in Sea of Japan to the west of Trudny Peninsula. It is a part of Peter the Great Gulf.

The bay is a shallow but its fauna is rich. Vostok Bay Sea Wildlife Preserve was founded in 1989.

Vostok Bay has no ecological problems and it is a summer recreation area.

The main settlements on coast are Nakhodka (suburbs Priiskovy, Livadiya and Yuzhno-Morskoy) and Volchanets.

Notes

Nakhodka
Bays of Primorsky Krai